was the first station on the Ōsaka Kaidō (or fifty-fourth of the fifty-seven stations of the Tōkaidō). It is located in Fushimi-ku in the present-day city of Kyoto, Kyoto Prefecture, Japan.

History
Fushimi-juku was founded in 1619. It was a successful post station because it also shared the area with the castle town surrounding Fushimi Castle, as well as Fushimi Port on the Yodo River.

Neighboring Post Towns
Ōsaka Kaidō (extended Tōkaidō)
Ōtsu-juku – Fushimi-juku – Yodo-juku

Stations of the Tōkaidō
History of Kyoto Prefecture